Song Tao (born April 1955) is a Chinese politician and senior diplomat, currently serving as director of the Taiwan Affairs Office. He served as head of the International Liaison Department of the Chinese Communist Party from 2015 to 2022. He was previously Chinese ambassador to Guyana, the Philippines, the disciplinary chief of the Ministry of Foreign Affairs, and executive deputy director of the Foreign Affairs Office.

Biography
Song was born Suqian, Jiangsu province, in April 1955. During the Cultural Revolution, when Song was a teenager, he performed manual labour as a sent-down youth in Sha County, Fujian. He worked in the province for his whole life. He attended Fujian Normal University.  Beginning in 1978, he worked at the Fujian Forestry Institute. He was later transferred to the Light Industry Institute of Fujian. He also worked in Luoyuan County, the Light Textiles Industry Company of Fujian, Fujian International Trust Company. From September 1988 to August 1991, he attended Monash University in Australia.  In 2001, he was named as an assistant to the Chinese ambassador to India. He then became ambassador to Guyana, a department chief in the Ministry of Foreign Affairs, and the ambassador to the Philippines.

In August 2008, he joined the party committee of the Ministry of Foreign Affairs and the head of discipline inspection of the ministry, in charge of supervision and anti-corruption activities. In September 2011, he was named vice minister of foreign affairs. In November 2013, he was named deputy head of the Foreign Affairs Office, the execution arm of the Foreign Affairs Leading Group. In September 2014, he was elevated to executive deputy chief of the office, with the rank equivalent of a minister.

In October 2015, Song accompanied Politburo Standing Committee member Liu Yunshan on a high-profile trip to North Korea. In November 2015, he replaced Wang Jiarui as head of the International Liaison Department of the Chinese Communist Party. Wang had been at the helm of the department for over a decade.

On 28 December 2022, he was appointed director of the Taiwan Affairs Office, succeeding Liu Jieyi.

Honours

Foreign Decorations
  Grand Cross of the Royal Order of Cambodia

References

People from Suqian
1955 births
Living people
People's Republic of China politicians from Jiangsu
Chinese Communist Party politicians from Jiangsu
Ambassadors of China to the Philippines
Monash University alumni
Fujian Normal University alumni